The Newcastle Mortuary railway station is a closed railway platform on the Newcastle railway line in New South Wales, Australia. The platform opened in 1883 and closed on 1 April 1933.

References

Disused regional railway stations in New South Wales
Railway stations in Australia opened in 1883
Railway stations closed in 1933